Irene Neverla (born 11 February 1952) is an Austrian professor of communication. Neverla chairs the Austrian state broadcaster's advisory board.

Life 
Neverla was born in Graz in 1952. She first studied journalism at the Vienna International Press Centre, before she studied Irene Neverla studied communication science, sociology and psychology at the Universities of Vienna and Salzburg.

She gained her doctorate at the University of Munich.

In 1992 she became a professor at the Faculty of Economics and Social Sciences at the University of Hamburg , specializing in journalism and communication sciences.

In 1980 she published her study Female journalists: women in a male profession noting that women were in the minority and there was a natural expectation that men would take the lead in discussions.

Her research focuses on journalism and reception research, visual communication , environmental, scientific and climate communication with a focus on climate change.

After her retirement in September 2017, she accepted an honorary professorship in the Department of Political and Social Sciences at Freie Universität Berlin in 2018 and began teaching at the Institute for Journalism and Communication Sciences.

In 2022 she took part in a panel discussion at the Freie Universität Berlin asking "Can the world still be saved?" with Antje Wilton, the journalist Sara Schurmann, Simon Horst and Carolin Schwegler. Neverla chairs the broadcaster's advisory board and said this was a mistake as although video was useful it was text that was the core of good jounrnalism and communication.

Selected works 

 Environmental Journalism, 2014 (editor with Henrik Bødker)
 Media, Communication and the Struggle for Democratic Change: Case Studies on Contested Transitions

References 

1952 births
Living people
People from Graz
Academic staff of the University of Hamburg
Climate activists
University of Vienna alumni
University of Salzburg alumni